Barotseland (Lozi: Mubuso Bulozi) is a region between Namibia, Angola, Botswana, Zimbabwe including half of eastern and northern provinces of Zambia and the whole of Democratic Republic of Congo's Katanga Province. It is the homeland of the Lozi people or Barotse, or Malozi, who are a unified group of over 46 individual formerly diverse tribes related through kinship, whose original branch are the Luyi (Maluyi), and also assimilated Southern Sotho tribe of South Africa known as the Makololo.

The Barotse speak Silozi, a language most closely related to Sesotho. Barotseland covers an area of 252,386 square kilometres, but is estimated to have been twice as large at certain points in its history. Once an empire, the Kingdom stretched into Namibia, Angola, Botswana, Zimbabwe including half of eastern and northern provinces of Zambia and the Democratic Republic of Congo's Katanga Province.

Under the British colonial administration, Barotseland was a Protectorate of the British Crown from the late 19th-century. The Litunga, the Lozi word for the king of Barotseland, had negotiated agreements, first with the British South African Company (BSAC), and then with the British government that ensured the kingdom maintained much of its traditional authority according to the Litunga. Barotseland was essentially a nation-state, a protectorate within the larger protectorate of Northern Rhodesia. In return for this protectorate status, the Litunga gave the BSAC mineral exploration rights in Barotseland.

In 1964, Barotseland became part of Zambia when that country achieved independence. However, some people claim that Zambia has violated the Barotseland Agreement 1964, and seek independence from Zambia. In 2012, a group of traditional Lozi leaders, calling itself the Barotseland National Council, called for independence; other tribal chieftains oppose secession, however.

Geography 

Its heartland is the Barotse Floodplain on the upper Zambezi River, also known as Bulozi or Lyondo, but it includes the surrounding higher ground of the plateau comprising all of what was the Western Province of Zambia. In pre-colonial times, Barotseland included some neighbouring parts of what are now the Northwestern, Central and Southern Province as well as Caprivi in northeastern Namibia and parts of southeastern Angola beyond the Cuando or Mashi River.

History

Origins 
The origins of Barotseland are unclear, but are a prominent subject in Lozi mythology. It is believed that the Barotse state was founded by Queen Mbuywamwambwa, the Lozi matriarch, over 500 years ago. Its people were migrants from the Congo. Other ethnic groupings that constitute the current Barotse kingdom migrated from South Africa, Angola, Zimbabwe, Namibia and Congo. The Barotse (the Lozi) reached the Zambezi River in the 17th century and their kingdom grew until it comprised some 25 peoples from Southern Rhodesia to the Congo and from Angola to the Kafue River. At the time, Barotseland was already a monarchy, when Lealui and Limulunga were seasonal capitals of the Lozi kings.

A detailed investigation into the history of the Barotse was carried out in 1939 in connection with the Balovale Dispute, see below.

In 1845 Barotseland had been conquered by the Makalolo (Kololo) from Lesotho – which is why the Barotse language, Silozi, is a variant of Sesotho. The Makololo were in power when Livingstone visited Barotseland, but after thirty years the Luyi successfully overthrew the Kololo king.

British colonisation 

Barotseland's status at the onset of the colonial era differed from the other regions which became Zambia. It was the first territory north of the Zambezi to sign a minerals concession and protectorate agreement with the British South Africa Company (BSAC) of Cecil Rhodes. 

By 1880, the kingdom was stabilised and King Lewanika signed a treaty on 26 June 1889 to provide the kingdom international recognition as a State. After the discovery of diamonds, King Lewanika began trading with Europe. The first trade concession was signed on 27 June 1889 with Harry Ware, in return King Lewanika and his kingdom were to be protected. Ware transferred his concession to Cecil Rhodes of the British South Africa Company. Seeking the improvement of the military protection and with the intention to sign a treaty with the British Government, King Lewanika signed on 26 June 1890 the Lochner concession putting Barotseland under the protection of the British South Africa Company.  At that time, there was European administration in Southern Rhodesia, in Nyasaland further East, and the beginnings of European administration in what was then called North-Eastern Rhodesia (centred on Fort Jameson, now Chipata) and also North-Western Rhodesia - basically Barotseland. Later, these two were administratively combined as simply "Northern Rhodesia", later divided up in five Provinces and Barotseland, which was treated slightly differently from the rest.

Later Lewanika protested to London and to Queen Victoria that the BSAC agents had misrepresented the terms of the concession, but his protests fell on deaf ears, and in 1899 the United Kingdom proclaimed a protectorate and governed it as part of Barotziland-North-Western Rhodesia.

Balovale Dispute 
In the 1930s, there was trouble between the Barotse and the Balovale and Balunda tribes who occupied the land to the north of the land occupied by the Barotse. The Barotse claimed that these were vassal tribes, while they claimed that they were not. Eventually, the Government set up a Commission to adjudicate, and the Barotse lost.

Barotseland Agreement 1964 
On 18 May 1964, the Litunga and Kenneth Kaunda, Prime Minister of Northern Rhodesia, signed the "Barotseland Agreement 1964" which established Barotseland's position within Zambia in place of the earlier agreement between Barotseland and the British Government. The agreement was based on a long history of close social, economic and political interactions, but granted significant continued autonomy to Barotseland. The Barotseland Agreement granted Barotse authorities local self-governance rights and rights to be consulted on specified matters, including over land, natural resources and local government. It also established the Litunga of Barotseland as "the principal local authority for the government and administration of Barotseland", that he would remain in control of the "Barotse Native Government", the "Barotse Native Authorities", the courts known as the "Barotse Native Courts", "matters relating to local government", "land", "forests", "fishing", "control of hunting", "game preservation", the "Barotse native treasury", the supply of beer and "local taxation". There was also to be no appeal from Barotseland's courts to the courts of Zambia.

Within a year of taking office as president of the newly independent Zambia on 24 October 1964, President Kenneth Kaunda began to introduce various acts that abrogated most of the powers allotted to Barotseland under the agreement. Notably, the Local Government Act of 1965 abolished the traditional institutions that had governed Barotseland and brought the kingdom under the administration of a uniform local government system. Then in 1969, the Zambian Parliament passed the Constitutional Amendment Act, annulling the Barotseland Agreement of 1964. Later that year the government changed Barotseland's name to Western Province and announced that all provinces would be treated "equally".  The agreement's dissolution and the stubbornness of successive governments in ignoring repeated calls to restore it have fuelled the region's ongoing tension. One of the reasons why Kenneth Kaunda "revoked" the United Kingdom's Zambia Independence Act is reported to be that it called for the continuation of Barotseland.

Barotseland independentists continued to lobby to be treated as a separate state and was given substantial autonomy within the later states, Northern Rhodesia and independent Zambia. At the pre-Independence talks, the Barotse simply asked for a continuation of "Queen Victoria's protection".

Post-colonial era 
A desire to secede was expressed from time to time, causing some friction with the government of Kenneth Kaunda, reflected in Kaunda changing the name from Barotseland Province to Western Province, and subsequently tearing up the 1964 Agreement. According to Barotse activists' views, the government in Lusaka also starved Barotseland of development – it has only one tarred road into the centre, from Lusaka to the provincial capital of Mongu, and lacks the kind of state infrastructure projects found in other provinces.  Electricity supplies are erratic, relying on an aging connection from the Kariba Dam hydroelectric plant. Consequently, secessionist views are still aired from time to time.

2012 call for independence 
In 2012, a Barotseland National Council accepted Zambia's abrogation of the Barotseland Agreement 1964, alleging to terminate the treaty by which Barotseland initially joined Zambia.

In 2013, Barotseland became a member of the UNPO, the Unrepresented Nations and Peoples Organization, joining Tibet and Taiwan at this international organisation dedicated to giving a voice to peoples who are currently unrepresented at the United Nations. Many modern States, including Estonia, Latvia, Armenia and East Timor, were former members of the UNPO.

Due to continuing human rights violations on the part of Zambia, in 2013 the Barotseland National Freedom Alliance also petitioned the African Commission on Human and Peoples' Rights in Banjul to examine Zambia's violations. This matter is currently being examined by the commission.

Politics

Institutions 

The national flag of Barotseland has a red field and a white stripe.

The traditional constitutional monarchy of Barotseland has Nilotic origins with the kingdom originally divided into north and south. The north being ruled by a man, the King, called the Litunga meaning "keeper" or "guardian of the earth", and the south is ruled by a woman, Litunga la Mboela or Mulena Mukwai, "Queen of the south". Both are allegedly directly descended from the ancient Litunga Mulambwa who ruled at the turn of the nineteenth century and through his grandson, Litunga Lewanika who ruled from 1878–1916, with one break in 1884–1885, who restored the traditions of the Lozi political economy in the arena of the invasion by the Makololo, internal competition, external threats such as that posed by the Matabele and the spread of European colonialism.

The government of Barotseland is the Kuta, presided over by the Ngambela (Prime Minister).

Current situation 
Activists claim Barotseland is now theoretically independent from Zambia, on the basis of the Zambian High Court ruling (see below) that the 1964 Agreement was unilaterally abrogated by Zambia as being null and void (see above) – i.e., Zambia washed its hands of Barotseland, which therefore reverted to the situation that existed before Zambian Independence; i.e. that Barotseland remains a Protectorate of Great Britain. However, Britain does not want to get involved.

Political parties 
In the 1962 elections, the Barotse National Party was established to contest the two Barotseland districts, as part of an electoral alliance with the United Federal Party. In both districts, the BNP candidate heavily lost to the UNIP candidate.

Currently, there are three groups who claim to represent Barotseland. In January 2012, the president of Zambia, Michael Sata, met the representatives of the three groups at the Zambian State House in Lusaka. The groups are Linyungandambo, Barotse Freedom Movement (BFM), and the Movement for the Restoration of Barotseland. Experts have said that these three groups may become political parties should Barotseland gain independence. Fighting between the three groups has already surfaced. An article which appeared on the Zambian Watchdog, purported to be authored by a BFM representative, condemned the activities of the Linyungandambo group. The BFM accused the Linyungandambo of having set up Barotseland Government portal website without consultations, and included BFM members in the purported Barotseland Government without their consent, and in disregard of the effort being made by Sata to find a lasting solution. The author, Shuwanga Shuwanga, stated that Linyungandambo had refused to work with the BFM back in 2011.

The various activist groups championing the self-determination of Barotseland have since formed one umbrella organisation called the Barotse National Freedom Alliance (BNFA) which is headed by the former Ngambela of Barotseland (Prime Minister) Clement W. Sinyinda.

References 

Regions of Africa
 
Geography of Zambia
Zambezi River
Former monarchies of Africa
Members of the Unrepresented Nations and Peoples Organization
Former countries in Africa